Etta H. Riel was an American woman who disappeared November 22, 1934 from Worcester, Massachusetts. Her case remains unsolved.

Case

Disappearance
In early 1934, Etta Riel was living with her family in Oxford, Massachusetts and attending nearby Worcester State Teachers College. In May she had filed a paternity suit against a local man, Henry Sawin, who she named as the father of her unborn baby. She and Sawin were dating at the time they graduated from Oxford High School in 1932. Sawin moved to Maine to attend Bates College, but he and Riel remained in contact. In September, Riel gave birth to a baby girl.

On the evening of November 21, Riel and Sawin spent several hours alone together. Early in the evening, Riel's hairdresser saw her talking with Sawin and, around midnight, an Oxford police officer observed Sawin's car parked in front of the Riel family home. Shortly after midnight, Riel informed her sister that she and Sawin had decided to marry. Stating that they were traveling to New York City that night, she packed a small travel bag and said she would return later in the week to retrieve her baby. She left in Sawin's car.

On November 22, the day of the scheduled paternity hearing, Riel's sister encountered Sawin, who denied making any marriage or travel plans with Riel and stated that he dropped her off at Worcester's Union Station hours before. When questioned by police, Sawin said that Riel had admitted to falsely accusing him of paternity and had expressed apprehension about the day's court proceedings. He said he was unaware of where she intended to travel that night and that she may have been suicidal. Sawin's claims seemed supported by letters Riel wrote to friends in October in which she expressed a desire to commit suicide.

On December 2, Riel's attorney received a telegram ostensibly signed by Riel directing him to withdraw the paternity case against Sawin. Police later discovered the telegram was ordered from a pay telephone in New York City by a caller who provided a false address. The identity of the sender was never determined. In 1935, several witnesses claimed they had seen or spoken to Riel in the weeks and months following her disappearance, but police were unable to confirm any sightings of Riel subsequent to November 22.

Investigation
Early in the investigation, police discovered that between 2 and 4 a.m. on. the day of Riel's disappearance, the Worcester train dispatcher and station master received three telephone calls to the station's unlisted numbers. The callers, one of whom claimed to be the Oxford switchboard operator, requested that Riel be located and prevented from boarding the train. Searches of the station that night failed to locate Riel. Subsequent police investigation showed that no such calls were placed from the Oxford telephone exchange and the callers were never identified.

While Sawin remained a person of interest throughout the investigation, police also questioned several other people whom they believed were connected to Riel's disappearance. Early in 1935, police investigated a Putnam, Connecticut man who had corresponded with Riel and had traveled to Florida with an unidentified companion around the time of her disappearance, but they later ruled out any further connection with the case. In August, police questioned a woman who claimed to have shared an apartment with Riel in Boston, but that witness was later committed to a psychiatric hospital.

The Massachusetts State Police conducted extensive searches for Riel's body, which continued for years after her disappearance. In the belief that Riel may have been clandestinely buried in an Oxford cemetery, police exhumed several graves in 1935 and 1937. In April 1935, police carried out a ground search for Riel in locations across Worcester County, including numerous ponds and areas in the nearby Purgatory Chasm. Also in 1935, police interviewed a local mystic who claimed that Riel was being held captive in the area by an unknown woman. Three years after Riel's disappearance, a detective assigned to the case stated that he believed Riel was alive.

Aftermath
In 1990, Riel's daughter, Alma Conlon, filed a paternity suit against Sawin, reviving the police investigation into her mother's disappearance after nearly 60 years. Conlon asked a probate judge to declare Sawin as her legal father, but her case was thrown out in 1993.

Publicity
Riel's case received wide publicity in New England in the 1930s and was covered by national wire services. In March 1937, "The Disappearance of Etta Riel" was the subject of New York's WOR radio Mystery Stories program. In May of that year, Liberty magazine published a feature-length article on the case. A 1948 article about the disappearance of Paula Jean Welden from Bennington College cited the Riel case, along with the 1925 disappearance of Alice Corbett from Smith College, as examples of other mysterious disappearances of New England college women.

See also
 List of people who disappeared

References

1930s missing person cases
1934 in Massachusetts
Missing person cases in Massachusetts
November 1934 events
History of Worcester, Massachusetts
People from Providence, Rhode Island